This is a list of  Spanish words that come from Indo-Aryan languages.  It is further divided into words that come from Persian, Romani and Sanskrit.  Some of these words have alternate etymologies and may also appear on a list of Spanish words from a different language.

Sanskrit 
Ajedrez
Avatar
Ario
Agra
Añil
Asana
Atutía, Tutía
Ayurveda
Barandilla
Bala
Bandana
Bonzo
Bodisatva
Brahmán
Brahmanismo
Bengala
Buda
Budismo
Bután
Carambola
Camelar
Catre
Chacal
Champú
Chakra
Chita
Cinta
Casimir
Cingalés
Chita
Copra
Devanagari
Esvástica
Gilí
Guar
Gurú
Gurja, Gurkha
Hindú
Himalayo
Índigo 
Indo
Indra
Jaines
Jainismo
Jenjibre
Jungla
Karma
Laca
Lacerar
Lila
Mandarín 
Mandarina
Maya
Moscatel
Mantra
Mandala
Naranja
Nadi
Naja
Naranjo
Narguile
Nenúfar
Nirvana
Ópalo 
Palanquín 
Pagar
Prana
Pantera
Pañí
Pali
Prácrito
Pebre
Ponche
Punyab
Purana
Quermes 
Rupia
Raga
Raja
Sandia
Sándalo 
Sánscrito
Sari
Sije
Tanque
Tantra
Tántrico
Yantra
Vaikunta
Vedas
Vedismo
Viajar
Visnú
Yambo
Yoga
Yogi
Zen

Persian
Alfil
Añil
Algarroba
Almizcle
Azabache
Azure
Azul
Babucha
Baldaquín
Bazar
Bezoar
Beige
Bórax
Bulbul
Caqui (Color)
Caravana
Carcaj
Casaca
Chal
Chancleta
Chalina
Cheque
Cobré
Diván
Escarlatina
Espinaca
Gaceta
Gasa
Jaque
Jazmín
Mate (Chess Term)
Mago
Parche
Paraíso
Percal
Persa
Persiana
Prisco
Pijama, Piyama
Quiosco
Roque
Sátrapa
Serrallo
Serendipitoso
Taburete
Taza
Tafetán
Talco
Tigre
Tulipán
Turán
Turbante
Zancada
Zanco
Zancudo
Zumbar
Zoroastro
Zaratustra
Zoroastrimo

Romani
Acharar
Achantar
Aroba
Barojí
Bato
Bujarra
Biruji
Calé
Caló
Catear
Camelar
Canguelo
Chachi
Chaval
Chavea
Chavo
Chavó
Chavalo
Chalado
Chamullar, Chamuyar
Chingar
Chinorri
Chivato
Choro
Currando
Curro
Currar
Chungo
Churumbel
Dabutí
Fetén
Ful
Fusca
Gachí
Gachó
Garito
Gil
Gilipollas
Jai
Jará
Jaco
Jindama
Jiñar
Junar
Julay
Lacha
Longuis
Luca
Lumi
Manú
Manús
Menda
Molar
Mulé
Nastí
Nanay
Naja
Najaero
Paripé
Pasma
Parné
Pestañí
Pinrel
Pipar
Pisgo
Pringar
Potra
Pureta
Queli
Sobar
Rom
Vato

See also
Linguistic history of Spanish
List of English words of Spanish origin

References
"Breve diccionario etimológico de la lengua española" by Guido Gómez de Silva

Indo-Aryan
Spanish